Kyoto (Japanese: , Kyōto ), officially , is the capital city of Kyoto Prefecture in Japan. Located in the Kansai region on the island of Honshu, Kyoto forms a part of the Keihanshin metropolitan area along with Osaka and Kobe. , the city had a population of 1.46 million. The city is the cultural anchor of a substantially larger metropolitan area known as Greater Kyoto, a metropolitan statistical area (MSA) home to a census-estimated 3.8 million people.

Kyoto is one of the oldest municipalities in Japan, having been chosen in 794 as the new seat of Japan's imperial court by Emperor Kanmu. The original city, named Heian-kyō, was arranged in accordance with traditional Chinese feng shui following the model of the ancient Chinese capitals of Chang'an and Luoyang. The emperors of Japan ruled from Kyoto in the following eleven centuries until 1869. It was the scene of several key events of the Muromachi period, Sengoku period, and the Boshin War, such as the Ōnin War, the Honnō-ji Incident, the Kinmon incident and the Battle of Toba–Fushimi. The capital was relocated from Kyoto to Tokyo after the Meiji Restoration. The modern municipality of Kyoto was established in 1889. The city was spared from large-scale destruction during World War II and as a result, its prewar cultural heritage has mostly been preserved.

Kyoto is considered the cultural capital of Japan and is a major tourist destination. It is home to numerous Buddhist temples, Shinto shrines, palaces and gardens, some of which have been designated collectively as a World Heritage Site by UNESCO. Prominent landmarks include the Kyoto Imperial Palace, Kiyomizu-dera, Kinkaku-ji, Ginkaku-ji, and Kyoto Tower. The internationally renowned video game company Nintendo is based in Kyoto. Kyoto is also a center of higher learning in the country, and its institutions include Kyoto University, the second oldest university in Japan.

Name
In the 11th century, the city was officially named "Kyōto" ("capital city"), from the Middle Chinese  (cf. Mandarin jīngdū). After the seat of the emperor was moved to the city of Edo and that city was renamed "Tōkyō" (meaning "eastern capital"), Kyoto was briefly known as "Saikyō" (meaning "western capital"). As the capital of Japan from 794 to 1868, Kyoto is sometimes called the thousand-year capital.

Historically, foreign spellings for the city's name have included Kioto and Miaco or Meaco.

History

Origins

Ample archeological evidence suggests human settlement in the area of Kyoto began as early as the Paleolithic period, although not much published material is retained about human activity in the region before the 6th century, around which time the Shimogamo Shrine is believed to have been established.

During the 8th century, when powerful Buddhist clergy became involved in the affairs of the imperial government, Emperor Kanmu chose to relocate the capital in order to distance it from the clerical establishment in Nara. His last choice for the site was the village of Uda, in the Kadono district of Yamashiro Province.

The new city, modeled after Chinese Tang dynasty capital Chang'an, became the seat of Japan's imperial court in 794, beginning the Heian period of Japanese history. Although military rulers established their governments either in Kyoto (Muromachi shogunate) or in other cities such as Kamakura (Kamakura shogunate) and Edo (Tokugawa shogunate), Kyoto remained Japan's capital until the transfer of the imperial court to Tokyo in 1869 at the time of the Imperial Restoration.

Middle Ages
In the Sengoku period, the city suffered extensive destruction in the Ōnin War of 1467–1477, and did not really recover until the mid-16th century. During the war, battles between samurai factions spilled into the streets, and came to involve court nobility (kuge) and religious factions as well. Nobles' mansions were transformed into fortresses, deep trenches dug throughout the city for defense and as firebreaks, and numerous buildings burned. The city has not seen such widespread destruction since.

In the late 16th century, Toyotomi Hideyoshi reconstructed the city by building new streets to double the number of north–south streets in central Kyoto, creating rectangle blocks superseding ancient square blocks. Hideyoshi also built earthwork walls called  encircling the city. Teramachi Street in central Kyoto is a Buddhist temple quarter where Hideyoshi gathered temples in the city.

Early modern period
Throughout the Edo period, the economy of the city flourished as one of three major cities in Japan, the others being Osaka and Edo. At the end of the period, the Hamaguri rebellion of 1864 burned down 28,000 houses in the city, which showed the rebels' dissatisfaction towards the Tokugawa Shogunate.

Modern period
At the start of the Meiji period, the emperor's move from Kyoto to Tokyo in 1869 weakened the economy of Kyoto. The modern city of Kyoto was formed on April 1, 1889. The construction of Lake Biwa Canal in 1890 was one measure taken to revive the city. The population of the city exceeded one million in 1932.

Contemporary history

There was some consideration by the United States of targeting Kyoto with an atomic bomb at the end of World War II because of the possibility that the city's importance was great enough that its loss might persuade Japan to surrender. In the end, at the insistence of Henry L. Stimson, Secretary of War in the Roosevelt and Truman administrations, the city was removed from the list of targets and replaced by Nagasaki. The city was largely spared from conventional bombing as well, although small-scale air raids did result in casualties. During the occupation, the U.S. Sixth Army and I Corps were headquartered in Kyoto.

As a result, Kyoto is one of the few Japanese cities that still have an abundance of prewar buildings, such as the traditional townhouses known as machiya. However, modernization is continually breaking down traditional Kyoto in favor of newer architecture, such as the Kyōto Station complex.

Kyoto became a city designated by government ordinance on September 1, 1956. In 1997, Kyoto hosted the conference that resulted in the protocol on greenhouse gas emissions (United Nations Framework Convention on Climate Change).

Geography

Terrain
Kyoto is located in a valley, part of the Yamashiro (or Kyoto) Basin, in the eastern part of the mountainous region known as the Tamba highlands. This interior positioning results in hot summers and cold winters. There are three rivers in the basin, the Uji River to the south, the Katsura River to the west, and the Kamo River to the east.

Kyoto sits atop a large natural water table that provides the city with ample freshwater wells. Due to large-scale urbanization, the amount of rain draining into the table is dwindling and wells across the area are drying at an increasing rate.

Climate
Kyoto has a humid subtropical climate (Köppen Cfa), featuring a marked seasonal variation in temperature and precipitation. Summers are hot and humid, but winters are relatively cold with occasional snowfall. Kyoto's rainy season begins around the middle of June and lasts until the end of July, yielding to a hot and sunny latter half of the summer. Kyoto, like most of the Pacific coast and central areas of Japan, is prone to typhoons during the summer and autumn.

Cityscape
Kyoto contains roughly 2,000 temples and shrines. The main business district is located to the south of the Kyoto Imperial Palace. In the center of the city, there are several covered shopping arcades only open to pedestrian traffic, such as Teramachi Street and Shinkyōgoku Street.

The original city was arranged in accordance with traditional Chinese feng shui following the model of the ancient Chinese capital of Chang'an/Luoyang. The Imperial Palace faced south, resulting in Ukyō (the right sector of the capital) being on the west, while Sakyō (the left sector) is on the east. The streets in the modern-day wards of Kamigyō-ku, Nakagyō-ku, and Shimogyō-ku still follow a grid pattern. Areas outside of the city center do not follow the same grid pattern, though streets throughout Kyoto are referred to by name, a practice that is rare in most regions of Japan.

Administrative divisions
In the 1870s, the city was divided into a northern ward (Kamigyō-ku) and a southern ward (Shimogyō-ku), each working as individual administrative divisions of Kyoto Prefecture. The modern municipality was created by the unification of these wards into the city of Kyoto in 1889.

Due to the creation of new administrative districts and a number of municipal mergers that took place between the 1920s and the 1970s, the contemporary city of Kyoto is divided into eleven . The central wards, located to the west of the Kamo River, are small and densely populated. The city hall is located in Nakagyō-ku, and the Kyoto prefectural offices are located in present-day Kamigyō-ku.

Demographics

Kyoto was the largest city in Japan until the late 16th century, when its population was surpassed by those of Osaka and Edo. Before World War II, Kyoto vied with Kobe and Nagoya to rank as the fourth or fifth largest city in Japan. Having avoided most wartime destruction, it was again the third largest city in 1947. By 1960 it had fallen to fifth again, and by 1990 it had fallen to seventh. , it was the ninth largest city in Japan by population and had led the country in population decrease for two consecutive years. However, the population of the city rises during standard working hours, and Kyoto ranks seventh in Japan in terms of daytime population.

Approximately 55% of the total population of Kyoto Prefecture is concentrated in the city of Kyoto, which is the highest ratio among the prefectures of Japan.

Government
The city of Kyoto is governed by the mayor of Kyoto and the Kyoto City Assembly, a municipal council.

Kyoto City Assembly

The legislative city assembly has 67 elected members, and terms are four years in length. As of 2022, the assembly is controlled by a coalition of members affiliated with the Liberal Democratic Party, Komeito, and the Democratic Civic Forum.

List of mayors
Between the founding of the modern city and 1898, the governor of Kyoto Prefecture also acted as the mayor of the city of Kyoto. From 1898 through the Second World War, mayors were nominated by the Kyoto City Assembly and appointed by the Minister of Home Affairs.

Since 1947, mayors of Kyoto have been chosen by direct election to four-year terms. As of 2022, there have been nine mayors elected using this system. While some mayors have resigned or died in office, no mayor has lost a reelection bid in the postwar period. In the 2020 Kyoto mayoral election, independent candidate Daisaku Kadokawa was re-elected for the third time, supported by the Liberal Democratic Party, Komeito, the Constitutional Democratic Party, the Democratic Party for the People, and the Social Democratic Party.

International relations

Twin towns – Sister cities
The city of Kyoto has sister-city relationships with the following cities:

 Boston, United States (since June 1959)
 Cologne, Germany (since May 1963)
 Florence, Italy (since September 1965)
 Guadalajara, Mexico (since October 1980)
 Kyiv, Ukraine (since September 1971)
 Prague, Czech Republic (since April 1996)
 Xi'an, China (since May 1974, friendship city)
 Zagreb, Croatia (since October 1981)

Partner cities
In addition to its sister city arrangements which involve multi-faceted cooperation, Kyoto has created a system of "partner cities" which focus on cooperation based on a particular topic. At present, Kyoto has partner-city arrangements with the following cities:

 Brussels, Belgium (since April 2006)
 Huế, Vietnam (since February 2013)
 Istanbul, Turkey (since June 2013)
 Jinju, South Korea (since March 1999)
 Konya, Turkey (since December 2009)
 Paris, France (since June 1958)
 Qingdao, China (since August 2012)
 Quebec City, Canada (since May 2016)
 Tainan, Taiwan (since June 2021)
 Varanasi, India (since August 2014)
 Vientiane, Laos (since November 2015)
 Yilan City, Taiwan (since August 2018)

Economy

Information technology and electronics are key industries in Kyoto. The city is home to the headquarters of Nintendo, Intelligent Systems, SCREEN Holdings, Tose, Hatena, Omron, Kyocera, Shimadzu, Rohm, Horiba, Nidec Corporation, Nichicon, Nissin Electric, and GS Yuasa.

Domestic and international tourism contributes significantly to Kyoto's economy. In 2014, the city government announced that a record number of tourists had visited Kyoto. As a result of a sharp decline in tourism during the COVID-19 pandemic, the mayor acknowledged in 2021 "the possibility of bankruptcy in the next decade" and announced job cuts in the administration and cuts in social assistance, including reductions in funding for home care.

Traditional Japanese crafts are also a major industry of Kyoto; Kyoto's kimono weavers are particularly renowned, and the city remains the premier center of kimono manufacturing. Sake brewing is another prominent traditional industry in Kyoto, and the headquarters of major sake brewers Gekkeikan and Takara Holdings are found in Kyoto.

Other notable businesses headquartered in Kyoto include Aiful, Ishida, Nissen Holdings, Gyoza no Ohsho, Sagawa Express, Volks, and Wacoal.

Education

Colleges and universities

Home to 40 institutions of higher education, Kyoto is one of the academic centers in Japan. Kyoto University is often ranked first or second among national universities nationwide. Influential private universities such as Doshisha University and Ritsumeikan University are also located in the city, and the Kyoto Institute of Technology is considered to be among the best universities in the country for architecture and design. 

The Consortium of Universities in Kyoto is a Kyoto-based higher education network consisting of three national universities, three public (prefectural and municipal) universities, 45 private universities, five other organizations, and representatives from the city government. The Consortium does not offer its own degree, but allows students to take courses at other participating universities.

In addition to Japanese universities and colleges, educational institutions from other countries operate programs in the city. The Kyoto Consortium for Japanese Studies (KCJS) is a group of 14 American universities that runs overseas academic programs in Japanese language and cultural studies for university students. Similarly, the Associated Kyoto Program runs a study-abroad academic program with a focus on cultural, language, and historical learning in and around the Kansai metropolitan area.

Transportation

Railways

Kyoto is served by rail transportation systems operated by several different companies and organizations. The city's main gateway terminal, Kyōto Station, connects the Tokaido Shinkansen bullet train Line with five JR West lines, a Kintetsu line, and a municipal subway line.

The Keihan Electric Railway, the Hankyu Railway, and other rail networks also offer frequent services within the city and to other cities and suburbs in the Kinki region. Although Kyoto does not have its own commercial airport, the Haruka Express operated by JR West carries passengers from Kansai International Airport to Kyōto Station in 73 minutes.

The Kyoto Railway Museum in Shimogyō-ku, operated by JR West, displays many steam, diesel, and electric locomotives used in Japan between the 1880s and the present.

High-speed rail
The Tokaidō Shinkansen, operated by JR Central, provides high-speed rail service linking Kyoto with Nagoya, Yokohama, and Tokyo to the east and with nearby Osaka to the west. Beyond Osaka, many trains boarding at Kyoto continue on the San'yō Shinkansen route managed by JR West, providing access to cities including Kobe, Hiroshima, and Fukuoka. The trip from Tokyo to Kyoto takes around 2.5 hours, and the trip from Hakata Station in Fukuoka to Kyoto takes just over three hours by Nozomi train service. All Shinkansen trains stop at Kyōto Station, including Hikari and Kodama trains.

Conventional lines

West Japan Railway Company（JR West）
Tōkaidō Main Line (JR Kyoto Line/Biwako Line)
San'in Main Line (Sagano Line)
Kosei Line
Nara Line
Hankyu
Hankyu Kyoto Main Line
Hankyu Arashiyama Line
Keihan Electric Railway (Keihan)
Keihan Main Line
Keihan Ōtō Line
Keihan Uji Line
Keihan Keishin Line
Kintetsu Railway (Kintetsu)
Kintetsu Kyoto Line
Sagano Scenic Railway
Sagano Scenic Line

Subways

The Kyoto Municipal Transportation Bureau operates the Kyoto Municipal Subway consisting of two lines: the Karasuma Line and the Tōzai Line. The two lines are linked at Karasuma Oike Station near the center of the economic district.

The Karasuma Line runs primarily north to south between the terminal of Kokusaikaikan Station and Takeda Station, and takes its name from the fact that trains run beneath Karasuma Street between Kitaōji Station in Kita-ku and Jūjō Station in Minami-ku. The Karasuma Line connects to the Hankyu Kyoto Main Line at the intersection of Shijō Karasuma in Kyoto's central business district and to JR lines and the Kyoto Kintetsu Line at Kyōto Station. In addition, the Transportation Bureau and Kintetsu jointly operate through services which continue to Kintetsu Nara Station in Nara.

The Tōzai Line runs from the southeastern area of the city towards the center, then east to west (tōzai in Japanese) through the Kyoto downtown area where trains run beneath the east–west streets of Sanjō Street, Oike Street, and Oshikōji Street. Within the city of Kyoto, the Tōzai Line also connects to Keihan lines at Yamashina Station, Misasagi Station, and Sanjō Keihan Station, and to the Keifuku Electric Railroad at the terminal of Uzumasa Tenjingawa Station.

Tramways
Keifuku Electric Railroad (Randen)
Keifuku Arashiyama Main Line
Keifuku Kitano Line
Eizan Electric Railway
Eizan Main Line
Eizan Kurama Line

Buses

Kyoto's municipal bus network is extensive. Private carriers also operate within the city. Many tourists join commuters on the public buses, or take tour buses. Kyoto's buses have announcements in English and electronic signs with stops written in the Latin alphabet. Buses operating on routes within the city, the region, and the nation stop at Kyōto Station. The intersection of Karasuma Kitaōji, near Kitaōji Station on the Karasuma Line north of downtown, has a major bus terminal.

Roads and waterways

Because many older streets in Kyoto are narrow, there are a significant number one-way roads without sidewalks. Cycling is a common form of personal transportation in the city, although there are few areas set aside for bicycle parking and bicycles parked in restricted areas are impounded.

Kyoto has fewer toll-highways than other Japanese cities of comparable size. There are nine national highways in the city of Kyoto: Route 1, Route 8, Route 9, Route 24, Route 162, Route 171, Route 367, Route 477, and Route 478.

The city is connected with other parts of Japan by the Meishin Expressway, which has two interchanges in the city: Kyoto Higashi (Kyoto East) in Yamashina-ku and Kyoto Minami (Kyoto South) in Fushimi-ku. The Kyoto Jūkan Expressway connects the city to northern regions of Kyoto Prefecture. The Second Keihan Highway is another bypass to Osaka.

Traditionally, trade and haulage took place by waterway, and there continue to be a number of navigable rivers and canals in Kyoto. In contemporary Kyoto, however, waterways are no longer commonly used for transportation of passengers or goods, other than for limited sightseeing purposes such as excursion boats on the Hozu River and cormorant fishing boats on the Ōi River.

Culture

Although ravaged by wars, fires, and earthquakes during its eleven centuries as the imperial capital, Kyoto suffered only minor damage in World War II. It was removed from the atomic bomb target list (which it had headed) by the personal intervention of Secretary of War Henry L. Stimson, as Stimson wanted to save this cultural center, which he knew from his honeymoon and later diplomatic visits.
Kyoto has been, and still remains, Japan's cultural center. About 20% of Japan's National Treasures and 14% of Important Cultural Properties exist in the city proper. The government of Japan plans to relocate the Agency for Cultural Affairs to Kyoto in 2023.

With its 2,000 religious places – 1,600 Buddhist temples and 400 Shinto shrines, as well as palaces, gardens and architecture intact – it is one of the best preserved cities in Japan. Among the most famous temples in Japan are Kiyomizu-dera, a magnificent wooden temple supported by pillars off the slope of a mountain; Kinkaku-ji, the Temple of the Golden Pavilion; Ginkaku-ji, the Temple of the Silver Pavilion; and Ryōan-ji, famous for its rock garden. The Heian Jingū is a Shinto shrine, built in 1895, celebrating the imperial family and commemorating the first and last emperors to reside in Kyoto. Three special sites have connections to the imperial family: the Kyoto Gyoen area including the Kyoto Imperial Palace and Sentō Imperial Palace, homes of the emperors of Japan for many centuries; Katsura Imperial Villa, one of the nation's finest architectural treasures; and Shugakuin Imperial Villa, one of its best Japanese gardens. In addition, the temple of Sennyu-ji houses the tombs of the emperors from Shijō to Kōmei.

Other sites in Kyoto include Arashiyama, the Gion and Ponto-chō geisha quarters, the Philosopher's Walk, and the canals that line some of the older streets.

The "Historic Monuments of Ancient Kyoto" are listed by the UNESCO as a World Heritage Site. These include the Kamo Shrines (Kami and Shimo), Kyō-ō-Gokokuji (Tō-ji), Kiyomizu-dera, Daigo-ji, Ninna-ji, Saihō-ji (Kokedera), Tenryū-ji, Rokuon-ji (Kinkaku-ji), Jishō-ji (Ginkaku-ji), Ryōan-ji, Hongan-ji, Kōzan-ji, and the Nijō Castle, primarily built by the Tokugawa shōguns. Other sites outside the city are also on the list.

Kyoto is renowned for its abundance of delicious Japanese foods and cuisine. The oldest restaurant in Kyoto is Honke Owariya which was founded in 1465.

Japan's television and film industry has its center in Kyoto. Many jidaigeki, action films featuring samurai, were shot at Toei Uzumasa Eigamura. A film set and theme park in one, Eigamura features replicas of traditional Japanese buildings, which are used for jidaigeki. Among the sets are a replica of the old Nihonbashi (the bridge at the entry to Edo), a traditional courthouse, a Meiji Period police box and part of the former Yoshiwara red-light district. Actual film shooting takes place occasionally, and visitors are welcome to observe the action.

The dialect spoken in Kyoto is known as Kyō-kotoba or Kyōto-ben, a constituent dialect of the Kansai dialect. Until the late Edo period, the Kyoto dialect was the de facto standard Japanese, although it has since been replaced by modern standard Japanese. Traditional Kyoto expressions include the polite copula dosu, the honorific verb ending -haru, and the greeting phrase okoshi-yasu.

Festivals
Kyoto is well known for its traditional festivals which have been held for over 1,000 years and are a major tourist attraction. The first is the Aoi Matsuri on May 15. Two months later (July) is the Gion Matsuri known as one of the 3 great festivals of Japan, culminating in a massive parade on July 17. Kyoto marks the Bon Festival with the Gozan no Okuribi, lighting fires on mountains to guide the spirits home (August 16). The October 22 Jidai Matsuri, Festival of the Ages, celebrates Kyoto's illustrious past.

UNESCO World Heritage Site

The UNESCO World Heritage Site Historic Monuments of Ancient Kyoto (Kyoto, Uji and Otsu Cities) includes fourteen temples, shrines, and castles in Kyoto dating from between the sixth century (Shimogamo Shrine, though extant structures are more recent) and the seventeenth century (Nijō Castle). The sites were designated as World Heritage in 1994.

Museums

 Hakusasonso Hashimoto Kansetsu Garden and Museum
 Hosomi Museum
 Joutenkaku Museum
 Kitamura Museum
 Koryo Museum of Art
 Kyoto Arashiyama Orgel Museum
 Kyoto Art Center
 Kyoto Botanical Garden
 Kyoto City Archaeological Museum
 Kyoto City Heiankyo Sosei-Kan Museum
 Kyoto International Manga Museum
 Kyoto Kaleidoscope Museum
 Kyoto Municipal Museum of Art
 Kyoto Museum for World Peace
 Kyoto Museum of Traditional Crafts
 Kyoto National Museum
 Kyoto Prefectural Garden of Fine Arts
 Kyoto Prefectural Insho-Domoto Museum of Fine Arts
 Kyoto Railway Museum
 Kyoto University Museum
 Museum of Kyoto
 Namikawa Cloisonne Museum of Kyoto
 National Museum of Modern Art, Kyoto
 Nomura Art Museum
 Onishi Seiwemon Museum
 Raku Museum
 Ryozen Museum of History
 Sen-oku Hakuko Kan
 Shigureden
 Tin Toy Museum
 Toei Kyoto Studio Park
 Yurinkan Museum

Sports

Kyoto has been the site of many annual sporting events, ranging from the 400-year-old Tōshiya archery exhibition held at the Sanjūsangen-dō Temple to the Kyoto Marathon and the Shimadzu All Japan Indoor Tennis Championships.

Several sports teams are based in Kyoto, including professional football and basketball teams. In football, Kyoto has been represented by Kyoto Sanga FC, a club which won the Emperor's Cup in 2002 and rose to J. League's Division 1 in 2005. Kyoto Sanga began as an amateur non-company club in the 1920s, making it the J. League team with the longest history, although it was only after professionalization in the 1990s that it was able to compete in the Japanese top division. Until 2019, Kyoto Sanga used Takebishi Stadium Kyoto in Ukyō-ku as its home stadium, but home matches were moved to the city of Kameoka, Kyoto in 2020. There are also several amateur football clubs based in Kyoto. The amateur clubs AS Laranja Kyoto, Ococias Kyoto AC, and Kyoto Shiko Soccer Club compete in the regional Kansai Soccer League.

Another professional team based in Kyoto is the Kyoto Hannaryz, a men's basketball team in the First Division of the B.League that plays its home games at the Kyoto City Gymnasium in Ukyō-ku. Kyoto has also been the home of other professional teams that have subsequently moved or been disbanded. Between 1949 and 1952, the Central League professional baseball team Shochiku Robins played home games at Kinugasa Ballpark in Kita-ku and Nishi-Kyōgoku Baseball Park (now known as Wakasa Stadium) in Ukyō-ku. This team eventually became the Yokohama DeNA BayStars. Kyoto also hosted two teams in the Japan Women's Baseball League before the league folded in 2021.

Company teams in Kyoto include two rugby squads, the Mitsubishi Motors Kyoto Red Evolutions and the Shimadzu Breakers, which compete in the Kansai regional rugby league Top West. In baseball, company teams have competed in the regional JABA Kyoto Tournament annually since 1947.

Kyoto Racecourse in Fushimi-ku is one of ten racecourses operated by the Japan Racing Association. It hosts notable horse races including the Kikuka-shō, Spring Tenno Sho, and Queen Elizabeth II Cup.

See also
List of bridges in Kyoto
List of Buddhist temples in Kyoto
List of fires in Kyoto
List of Shinto shrines in Kyoto
Outline of Kyoto

References

Citations

Bibliography

Fiévé, Nicolas (ed.) (2008) Atlas historique de Kyôto. Analyse spatiale des systèmes de mémoire d’une ville, de son architecture et de ses paysages urbains. Foreword Kôichirô Matsuura, Preface Jacques Gernet, Paris, Éditions de l’UNESCO / Éditions de l’Amateur, 528 pages, 207 maps et 210 ill. .
Fiévé, Nicolas and Waley, Paul. (2003). Japanese Capitals in Historical Perspective: Place, Power and Memory in Kyoto, Edo and Tokyo. London: Routledge. 417 pages + 75 ill. 
Lone, John. (2000). Old Kyoto: A Short Social History. Oxford: Oxford University Press. .
Ponsonby-Fane, Richard A. B. (1956). Kyoto: The Old Capital of Japan, 794–1869. Kyoto: The Ponsonby Memorial Society.
Ropke, Ian Martin. Historical Dictionary of Osaka and Kyoto. 273pp Scarecrow Press (July 22, 1999) .

External links

Kyoto City Official Website (in Japanese)
Kyoto City Official Travel Guide, City of Kyoto and Kyoto City Tourism Association (in English)

 
Populated places established in the 8th century
1889 establishments in Japan
Buddhist pilgrimage sites in Japan
Former capitals of Japan
Environmental model cities
Cities designated by government ordinance of Japan